Serramonacesca is a comune and town in the province of Pescara in the Abruzzo region of southern Italy.

Main sights
Abbey of San Liberatore a Maiella
Hermitage of Saint Onofrio
The Polegra Tower
Castel Menardo
Rock-cut tombs of San Liberatore
Rock-cut complex of San Liberatore

References

External links
Official website 

 
Cities and towns in Abruzzo